Saint Anne is the mother of the Virgin Mary and grandmother of Jesus Christ, according to Catholic tradition.

Saint Anne may also refer to:

People
Saint Anne Line (d. 1601), English Catholic martyr
Saint Anna Pak Agi, one of the Korean Martyrs

Places

Canada
Ste. Anne
Sainte-Anne Parish, New Brunswick, formerly named St. Anne Parish
St. Anne Island, Ontario, see List of islands of Ontario
Sainte-Anne-de-Beaupré, Quebec
Basilica of Sainte-Anne-de-Beaupré

Channel Islands 
 St Anne, Alderney, Channel Islands

Seychelles
Ste. Anne Island

United Kingdom 
 St Annes, a town within Lytham St Annes

United States
St. Anne, Illinois

Art
 Saint Anne (wall painting), an 8th–9th century Makurian wall painting

Organisations
St. Anne's Church, the name of several churches
Society of Saint Anne, a New Orleans Mardi Gras krewe

Transportation
HMS St Anne, the name of two ships of the Royal Navy
St Anne, a schooner beached at Porthleven in 1931

See also
St Ann (disambiguation)
Sainte-Anne (disambiguation)
St Anne's (disambiguation)
St Ann's (disambiguation)
Santa Ana (disambiguation)
Anna (disambiguation)
Fort Sainte Anne (disambiguation)